Viktor Drugov (born May 12, 1986) is a Russian professional ice hockey winger who currently plays for HC Tambov in the Supreme Hockey League (VHL). He joined Tambov after previously playing with Admiral Vladivostok of the Kontinental Hockey League (KHL).

References

External links

1986 births
Living people
Admiral Vladivostok players
Atlant Moscow Oblast players
HC Lada Togliatti players
Metallurg Novokuznetsk players
Sportspeople from Barnaul
Russian ice hockey left wingers
HC Sibir Novosibirsk players
Torpedo Nizhny Novgorod players
Traktor Chelyabinsk players
HC Vityaz players